Saeed Abdul Rahman Ahmed Abu Ali  (1955 in Jenin -) is a Palestinian politician and jurist. He held important roles in the Palestinian presidency.  He was the governor of the governorates of Nablus, Ramallah and Al-Bireh.  Also was the Palestinian Minister of Interior, and he currently holds the position of Assistant Secretary-General of the League of Arab Nations.

Early life and education
Saeed Abu Ali was born in 1955 in the Jenin Governorate, northern part of West Bank, State of Palestine. He studied bachelor's degree in Law from Al-Quds University. Then he moved to Tunisia and joined the Palestine Liberation Organization. He obtained a bachelor's degree in journalism and information, a master's degree in 1989 in political science and a doctorate in law in 1995. In 1992 he got doctorate in international organizations from University of Toulouse, France. In 2015 he received a degree Professor from Al-Quds University.

Career
The positions held by Abu Ali are:

 1980–1984 : Member of the Permanent Delegate of Palestine to the Arab League of Nations.
 1984–1989 : Director of Arab Affairs at the Palestinian Planning Center in Tunis.
 1989–1995 : Adviser to the Embassy of the Palestine Liberation Organization 
 1995–2002 : Director General of the Presidential Secretariat.
 2002–2005 : Assistant Secretary of the Presidential Secretariat.
 2005 : Governor of the Ministry of the Interior and National Security and Coordinator for Governor's Affairs.
 2005 : Assistant to the Secretary General of the Presidency  in the Ministry of the Interior and National Security to the Palestinian Presidency &  coordinator for governorate affairs.
 2005–2006 : Governor of  Nablus Governorate.
 2006–2009 : Governor of Ramallah and Al-Bireh Governorate.
 2009–2014 : Minister of Interior.
 2016–present : Assistant Secretary-General and President of the Palestine Sector and the Occupied Palestinian Territories.

Abu Ali also worked since 1995 and at various times as a lecturer at the rank of associate professor in several Palestinian universities like Al-Azhar University, Birzeit University and Al-Quds University.

Awards
 On August 25, 2013, Palestinian President Mahmoud Abbas Saeed Abu Ali awarded the Jerusalem Military Star Order.

References

External links

Academic staff of Al-Azhar University – Gaza
Academic staff of Al-Quds University
1955 births
Governors of Nablus Governorate
Governors of Ramallah and al-Bireh Governorate
Government ministers of the Palestinian National Authority
Government ministers of the State of Palestine
Academic staff of Birzeit University
Al-Quds University alumni
University of Toulouse alumni
Palestinian jurists
Living people